is a music unit from Japan consists of Yuki Takao (vocals, lyricist) and Chamōi (illustrator). The unit debuted with song titled "Sentimental Love", a theme song for A Town Where You Live. The girls call themselves a "next generation audio visual unit" and offer a unique mixture of music and imagery. The unit name, "Mimi Meme Mimi", is thought under the wish that they wanted their songs to appeal their listener .

On 18 July 2017, the group announced its disbandment following the group's September 2017 live  due to Yuki Takao's retirement from both singing and voice acting.

Members

Yuki Takao born on June 30, 1990 at Hyōgo Prefecture. She is a female voice actor and singer-songwriter. Before debuting as Mimi Meme Mimi with Chamōi, she already started her career as songwriter, using the pseudonym .

Chamōi responsible for all visual illustration for the unit's songs. Her theme is pop, cute, and create a colorful digital illustrations. The origin of her name is taken from cry shouts from a Pokémon, "chamōi!"

Discography

Singles

Albums

Split albums

Notes

References

External links
Official website 

Anime musical groups
Japanese musical groups
Japanese pop music groups
Musical groups established in 2012
2012 establishments in Japan